Butuanon is an Austronesian regional language spoken by the Butuanon people in Agusan del Norte and Agusan del Sur, with some native speakers in Misamis Oriental and Surigao del Norte. It is a part of the Bisayan language family and is closely related to other Philippine languages. As of 2007, Butuanon is believed to be spoken by fewer than 500 youngsters in Butuan itself. 

Butuanon is very closely related to the Tausug language of distant Sulu and the Surigaonon language of neighboring provinces Surigao del Sur and Surigao del Norte.

Orthography
 a – [a]
 b – [b]
 d – [d]
 g – [g]
 h – [h]
 i – [i]
 k – [k]
 l – [l]
 m – [m]
 n – [n]
 ng – [ŋ]
 ny – [ɲ]
 o – [o]
 p – [p]
 r – [r]
 s – [s]
 t – [t]
 u – [u]
 w – [w]
 y – [j]

Long vowels are written as double letters (e.g. aa, ii, etc.)

References

Further reading

 
 

Languages of Agusan del Norte
Languages of Agusan del Sur
Visayan languages